This is a list of films which have placed number one at the weekend box office in Romania during 2012.

Highest-grossing films

See also 

 List of Romanian films
 List of highest-grossing films in Romania

References 

2012
2012 in Romanian cinema
Romania